Flo is a small village in the municipality of Stryn in Vestland county, Norway. Directly south across the lake is the Jostedalsbreen nasjonalparksenter, a visitor's center for the nearby Jostedalsbreen National Park.

Flo has become famous as the ancestral home of national and international footballers, all of whom are related: The brothers Kjell Rune Flo, Jostein Flo, Tore André Flo and Jarle Flo, all of whom grew up in nearby Stryn, as well as their cousin Håvard Flo who grew up in Flo. In addition Kjell Rune's son Ulrik Flo and Håvard's nephew Per Egil Flo have played for Sogndal Fotball in the Tippeligaen. Per Egil now plays for Slavia Prague. All in all, seven members of the Flo family have played in Tippeligaen, and four (Jostein, Håvard, Tore André and Per Egil) have played for Norway's national team.

References

Villages in Vestland
Stryn